Ezequiel Esteban Luna (born 19 November 1986 in Villa Gobernador Gálvez, Santa Fe Province) is an Argentine professional footballer who plays for Chilean club San Luis as a defender.

External links

1986 births
Living people
People from Rosario Department
Sportspeople from Santa Fe Province
Argentine footballers
Association football defenders
Argentine Primera División players
Primera Nacional players
Tiro Federal footballers
Atlético Tucumán footballers
La Liga players
Segunda División players
Segunda División B players
CD Tenerife players
L.D.U. Quito footballers
Chilean Primera División players
Santiago Wanderers footballers
Club Deportivo Palestino footballers
Argentine expatriate footballers
Expatriate footballers in Spain
Expatriate footballers in Ecuador
Expatriate footballers in Chile
Argentine expatriate sportspeople in Spain
Argentine expatriate sportspeople in Chile
Argentine expatriate sportspeople in Ecuador